In differential geometry, Meusnier's theorem states that all curves on a surface passing through a given point p and having the same tangent line at p also have the same normal curvature at p and their osculating circles form a sphere. The theorem was first announced by Jean Baptiste Meusnier in 1776, but not published until 1785.
At least prior to 1912, several writers in English were in the habit of calling the result Meunier's theorem, although there is no evidence that Meusnier himself ever spelt his name in this way.
This alternative spelling of Meusnier's name also appears on the Arc de Triomphe in Paris.

References

Further references
Meusnier's theorem Johannes Kepler University Linz,  Institute for Applied Geometry
Meusnier's theorem in Springer Online

Theorems in differential geometry